The Battle of Qarawal was fought Between the Sikhs under the command of Charat Singh against the Afghan forces lead by Ahmad Shah Abdali and his Kalat ally Nasir Khan.It was the battle in which Afghan and Kalati forces were tried to defeat the Sikh misl and force them to withdraw to Amritsar.

Background
Following Ahmad Shah's sixth campaign and his withdrawal, the Sikhs took advantage of his absence by rising up against his rule. The Sikhs defeated the Afghans at Kasur and much of the Jullunder doab was overrun by the Sikhs. And early in January 1764, Sirhind also fell to Sikh control.

Hearing news of this, Ahmad Shah was enraged and began mobilizing for another invasion of India. Ahmad Shah mobilized 18,000 men and also called upon Nasir Khan of Kalat. Ahmad Shah and Nasir Khan marched their forces across the Punjab, with Nasir Khan crossing the Ravi river. The two forces united at Eminabad. The following day, Ahmad Shah marched to the Ravi river again, before marching on Lahore. Ahmad Shah then held a Durbar in the fort of Lahore.

The next morning, news arrived that the Sikhs had attacked Qarawal, with two of the sardars there, Gahram Khan and Ahmad Khan requesting immediate support. Ahmad Khan and his son were killed in the battle.

Battle
Following this, Afghan reinforcements to the battle arrived under Nasir Khan, and fighting began. Nasir Khan himself came forward in the battle and begin skirmishing. Charat Singh then advanced to oppose him. However, Nasir Khan charged upon him, to which, Charat Singh fled to the safety of his troops. During this, a Sikh gunner shot Nasir Khan's horse, killing it. Despite this, Nasir Khan returned to his troops unharmed, and his men chanted "Bismillah" for his safe return. Two of Nasir's servants, Muhammad Husain and Mir Mangah killed the Sikh gunner.

As the rest of the Durrani reinforcements came into battle, The Sikhs were routed from the battlefield, and fled from the battle at night.

Aftermath

Following this victory, Ahmad Shah advised Nasir Khan to not fight again in the front ranks of battle. After his battle with Charat Singh,Ahmad Shah received news that the Sikhs had retreated to the city of Amritsar. Ahmad Shah and the Afghan forces entered Amritsar on December 1, 1764.It was at Amritsar that he would get into a skirmish with Baba Gurbaksh Singh along with 29 other Sikh defenders at Shri Harmandir Sahib.It was in this skirmish that all 30 Sikh defenders were killed and the Shri Harmandir Sahib was destroyed under the orders of Ahmad Shah.

References 

18th century in the Durrani Empire
Military history of India
Battles involving the Sikhs
Battles involving the Durrani Empire